David Black (born May 29, 1928) is an American sculptor known for his large scale public sculptures.

Early life and artistic career 
David Black was born in 1928 on the island of Gloucester, Massachusetts, whose ocean seascape, rough granite shoreline and iconic white lighthouses, white oceanside hotels, white churches and ships were to dominate his work his entire career. He later revealed that a near death experience as a very young child where he was not expected to live after falling from a tree, was a driving force in his lifelong obsession with archaic, spiritual forms and architecture.

He left Cape Ann in 1946 to study science at Wesleyan University. During the summers he returned to work as a lifeguard on Gloucester's Wingaersheek Beach where he met sculptor George Aarons, who had a studio in the sand dunes nearby. The experience made such an impression, that two years into college, he changed his major to art, embarking on a career as a sculptor. The summer of 1949 Black attended the Skowhegan School of Painting and Sculpture, which solidified his choice to pursue art. 

For the first 12 years, he made exclusively ceramic pottery and sculptures, winning the First Prize for Ceramics at the American Crafts Museum in New York in 1957. Later he received fellowships that took him to other countries and ancient cultures. A Fulbright fellowship grant in 1962 allowed him to live a year and a half in Florence, Italy, investigating ancient Etruscan art, making sculptures(in the former studio of Leonardo Da Vinci) and having them cast in bronze in nearby Pistoia.

While further investigating the monumental structures, this time of ancient Meso-America, he set up a temporary studio in Mexico in 1966, casting in aluminum and designing wall-hangings to be woven in wool by local, Indigenous weavers.

In 1970, he received the two-year Artist in Residence grant from DAAD, the German Academic Exchange, to live in then West-Berlin, Germany. There, the Neue Nationalgalerie (New National Gallery), commissioned the monumental sculpture, Skypiece, for its courtyard fountain and held an exhibition of his sculpture at the Amerika Haus, Berlin. He returned again in 1977 for a one-man-exhibition in the Neue Nationalgalerie. This exhibition was shown as well at the Wilhelm Lehmbruck Museum in Duisburg, Germany.

Returning to the United States, Black received an “Individual Artist Grant” from the National Endowment of the Arts while being awarded a full professorship at the Ohio State University. It was at this time, around 1980, that he began producing monumental, abstract public sculpture, working again in metal, this time with massive plates of industrial aluminum.

Public sculpture 

More than 40 major sculptures, most the result of winning open competitions, are installed throughout the US, as well as in Germany, Japan and Canada. Black describes his work as “proto-architecture,” a reference to his fusion of archetypal architectural motifs, such as columns, pillars, arches, and the use of light with the energy and references of sculpture. His community landmarks engage their environments and the viewer spatially, as well as culturally, strongly connecting with the viewer as they move through and around the work.

Some examples of his most important work include:

Black's monumental sculpture Wind Point won the Shikanai, First Prize in the Henry Moore International Sculpture Competition in Nagano, Japan in 1985. It is permanently installed atop a mountain at the entrance to the Utsukushi-ga-hara Art Museum.

His Flyover in Dayton, a stainless steel “flight path” arch 46 meters long (150 feet) and five stories tall, commemorating the Wright Brothers’ first flight in 1903, won an international competition and was awarded the “Meritorious Structure Award” from the National Council of Structural Engineers Associations in 1999.
In 2010–2011 David Black finished two major public sculptures: Liftoff in Downtown Washington D.C and Fire Dance in Fort Myers.

Black’s sculpture Skypiece has recently been restored and rebuilt as the permanent fountain centerpiece for the reopening of Mies van der Rohe´s New National Gallery in Berlin in the summer of 2021.

Recognition 

New York art critic Donald Kuspit, writes in a printed essay about Black's public sculptures: "They are remarkable for their sense of elation – a novelty in public space-and dynamics, which makes them an exciting environment unto themselves, even as they anchor the environment they inhabit, humanizing it in the process…"Of all the artists now that I know of, who make works that are meant for public space, David Black is, to my mind, unequivocally the most important.

Hilton Kramer writes in a New York Times review: "his forms have an admirable definition, almost a simplicity, which is yet the result of a certain metaphorical development and resolution (...). It is as a sculptor, with a real feeling for his craft, that Mr. Black makes an impression.”

Thalia Gouma-Petyerson writes in the magazine Sculpture Outdoors about Black's predilection for the color white: "he is ‘enamored of white objects partly because of their commonness and partly because of a sacred quality. With his sculptures, he tries to create a bridge between the common and the sacred."

Robert A. Malone, former Dean of The Pratt Institute, also comments on the spiritual quality of Black's work: "His sculpture is transcendent in the same way that good music can be transcendent, not in the religious sense of being parochial."

David Black’s works have been exhibited in the U.S. at the Contemporaries Gallery and PS One, the Gilman Gallery, the Taft Museum, the Indianapolis Museum of Art, the Columbus Museum of Art, the University of Iowa Art Museum, the Dayton Art Institute, and in Germany at the Neue Nationalgalerie, the Amerika Haus and the Lehmbruck Museum .

Public works 
This is a list of artworks by David Black that are available to the public.

United States

Alaska
Open Skies, 2005, Hutchison Institute, University of Alaska, Fairbanks, Alaska

Arizona
Sonora, 1991, Plaza, main library, Tucson, Arizona

California
Jetty, 1990, Island Park, Belmont, California

Florida
 Fire Dance, 2011, Edison Circle, Centennial Park, Ft. Myers, FL

Indiana
 Crossings, 1984, Fort Wayne Museum of Art, Fort Wayne, Indiana
 Rotunda Fountain, 2000, Hammond, Indiana

Iowa
 Rapids, 1999, Cedar Rapids, Iowa

Michigan
 New Arcadia, 1987, College Park, Kalamazoo, Michigan
 Quadrant, 1988, Central Michigan University, Mt. Pleasant, Michigan

New York
 Portside, 1984, Clarkson University, Potsdam, New York

Ohio
 Breaker, 1982,  Wexner Center for the Arts, Ohio State University, Columbus, Ohio
 Coastline, 1983, Case Western Reserve University, Cleveland, Ohio
 Ottawa Gate, 1994, Ottawa Park, Toledo, Ohio
 Euclid's Circle, 1995, University Circle, Euclid Ave. at Mayfield, Cleveland, Ohio
 Flyover, 1996, Dayton, Ohio
 Inner Circles, 1996,  Youngstown State University, Youngstown, Ohio
 Viewpoint , 1997,  Cincinnati State Technical and Community College, Columbus, Ohio
 Turning Points, 1998, Wright State University, Dayton, Ohio
 Outlook, 2007, Zanesville Art Center, Zanesville, Ohio

Washington D.C.
 Lift Off, 2009, City Vista Plaza, K St. at 5th St., Washington, D.C.

International

Japan
 Windpoint, 1985,  Utsukushi-ga-Hara Museum, Nagano, Japan

Germany
 Skypiece,  1972 and rebuilt in 2021, Neue Nationalgalerie, Berlin

References

See also 
List of public works by David Black
Lift Off (sculpture)
Breaker (Black)

20th-century American sculptors
21st-century American sculptors
21st-century American male artists
American male sculptors
1928 births
Living people
Sculptors from Massachusetts
20th-century American male artists